Heterodera filipjevi is a plant pathogenic nematode affecting barley.

See also 
 List of barley diseases

References

External links 
 Nemaplex, University of California - Heterodera filipjevi

filipjevi
Plant pathogenic nematodes
Barley diseases